Provincial Trunk Highway 11 (PTH 11) is a provincial primary highway located in the Eastman Region of the Canadian province of Manitoba. It runs from an intersection with PTH 59 near Victoria Beach to an intersection with PTH 1.

Route description

PTH 11 begins at an intersection with PTH 1 (Trans-Canada Highway) in the hamlet of Hadashville, located in the Rural Municipality of Reynolds. The highway heads north through the hamlet, running parallel to the western banks of the Whitemouth River, eventually leaving and traveling just to the west of Medika and Reynolds, having intersections with PR 507 and PR 506, before crossing into the Rural Municipality of Whitemouth.

PTH 11 travels straight through the town of Elma, where it has a junction with PTH 15 and makes its first crossing of the Whitemouth River, before becoming concurrent with PTH 44 and making its second crossing of the river as the two head west. The highway curves northwestward to follow along the western banks of the river, having an intersection with PR 406 as they travel through the town of Whitemouth. PTH 11 / PTH 44 have an intersection with PR 408 as they wind up the riverbanks for several kilometers before PTH 11 splits off and heads north at a junction in Siegs Corner. PTH 11 has an intersection with PR 307 near Seven Sisters Falls, where the highway joins the La Vérendrye Trail, as well as passes by the Whiteshell Provincial Park (the site of where the Whitemouth River merged into the Winnipeg River).

PTH 11 follows the Winnipeg river northward to cross into the Rural Municipality of Lac du Bonnet immediately before having an intersection with PR 211 (leads to Pinawa and Pinawa Provincial Wayside Park) and traveling through Brookfield. The highway passes briefly through the Pinawa Local Government District before re-entering the Rural Municipality of Lac du Bonnet and having an intersection with PR 214. It now travels through the town of Lac du Bonnet, mostly following a western bypass of the town as it has intersections with PR 502 and PR 317. The highway travels along the coastline of Lac du Bonnet and has an intersection with PR 313 before crossing into the Rural Municipality of Alexander.

PTH 11 passes by several reservoirs along the Winnipeg River for the next several kilometers, traveling through Crescent Bay and past McArthur Falls Generating Station. The highway curves to the west, as it travels through the hamlet of Great Falls and passes by the Great Falls Generating Station, before winding its way northwest along the riverbanks, passing through White Mud Falls, Silver Falls, and St. Georges. It enters the town of Powerview-Pine Falls at an intersection with PR 304, passing directly through both sectors of town before leaving Powerview-Pine Falls and traveling through the Sagkeeng First Nation for the next several kilometers.

PTH 11 re-enters the Rural Municipality of Alexander as it starts following the southeastern coastline of Lake Winnipeg, which follows westward for a few kilometers before coming to an end at an intersection with PTH 59, just south of the border with the Rural Municipality of Victoria Beach. La Vérendrye Trail follows PTH 59 southbound.

With the exclusion of an extremely short section of 4-land divided highway at the junction between PTH 44 and PTH 11 in Siegs Corner, the entire length Provincial Trunk Highway 11 is a paved, rural, two lane highway.

History
PTH 11 is one of the original numbered highways within the province of Manitoba, first appearing on the original 1926 Manitoba Highway Map. Originally a short connector highway spanning  between PTH 1 at Seddons Corner and Lac du Bonnet, the highway was extended north to Pine Falls in 1947.

In 1954, PTH 11 obtained the distinction of being both a north-south and east-west highway much like current Provincial Trunk Highways 5, 20, and 50. That year, the highway was extended south through Whitemouth (running in concurrence with PTH 1), Elma and Hadashville before turning west to meet PTH 12 just north of Ste. Anne. The following year, the section between PR 214 and PTH 44 was completed and opened to traffic. The former east-west section of PTH 11 was redesignated as PTH 1 in 1958 in preparation for its inclusion in the Trans-Canada Highway system four years later. This redesignated PTH 11 to its current southbound terminus near Hadashville.

PTH 11 was extended farther north from Pine Falls to its current northbound terminus with PTH 59 in 1966, replacing what had been previously designated as PTH 12.

Major intersections

References

External links 
Official Name and Location - Declaration of Provincial Trunk Highways Regulation - The Highways and Transportation Act - Provincial Government of Manitoba
Official Highway Map - Published and maintained by the Department of Infrastructure - Provincial Government of Manitoba (see Legend and Map#3)
Google Maps Search - Provincial Trunk Highway 11

011